Skyscraping is the seventh studio album by English pop band ABC, released in March 1997 by Blatant and Deconstruction. The album was produced as a homage to lead singer Martin Fry's several musical heroes, including David Bowie, Roxy Music and the Sex Pistols.

It is their first album without founding member, keyboardist and guitarist Mark White, who had up until that point been heavily involved in the composition and production of their work. As the line-up of ABC without White consisted solely of Fry, Glenn Gregory of Heaven 17 and Keith Lowndes were brought in as songwriting and performance collaborators. The album was met with positive reviews from critics but little commercial success.

Three singles were released: "Stranger Things", "Skyscraping" and "Rolling Sevens". An expanded 2CD edition of the album was released by Cherry Red Records on 23 September 2013.

In September 2022 the album was finally released on Spotify and other digital platforms.

Track listing 
All songs written and composed by Martin Fry, Glenn Gregory, and Keith Lowndes except where indicated.

1997 Blatant/Deconstruction 74321 45653 2/BMG Japan BVCP-6029 
"Stranger Things" - 5:18
"Ask a Thousand Times" - 5:13
"Skyscraping" - 4:20
"Who Can I Turn To?" - 3:48
"Rolling Sevens" - 4:31
"Only The Best Will Do" - 4:19
"Love Is Its Own Reward" - 4:08
"Light Years" - 6:40
"Seven Day Weekend" (John Uriel) - 3:31
"Heaven Knows" - 3:59
"Faraway" - 5:20
"Stranger Things (Acoustic Version)" (Japan only) - 5:09

2013 Cherry Pop Remaster bonus disc
"The World Spins On" ("Stranger Things" B-side) - 3:44
"All We Need" ("Stranger Things" B-side) - 4:33
"Stranger Things" (Acoustic) - 5:09
"Skydubbing" (dub mix of "Skyscraping") - 7:27
"Stranger Things" (Live) - 4:55
"Rolling Sevens" (Radio Edit) - 3:33
"The Look of Love" (Live) - 3:54
"All of My Heart" (Live) - 5:53
"Skyscraping" (Alternate Version) - 4:16

Chart performance

Personnel 
 Martin Fry – lead and backing vocals

Musicians
 Keith Lowndes – keyboards, guitars, drum programming
 Glenn Gregory – additional keyboards (1, 2, 5, 6, 8, 10), backing vocals (1, 2, 4, 5, 6, 9, 10)
 Paul Rabiger – additional acoustic piano (2), saxophone (2, 4, 8)
 Phil 'Snake' Davies – saxophone (7)
 Dinah Bemish – cello (1, 3, 4)
 Jocelyn Pook – viola (1, 3, 4)
 Sally Herbert – violin (1, 3, 4)
 Sonia Slany – violin (1)
 Jules Singleton – violin (3, 4)
 Carol Kenyon – backing vocals (2, 5, 10)
 Juliet Roberts – backing vocals (3, 4, 11)
 Paul 'Tubbs' Williams – backing vocals (3, 4, 11)

Production 
 Martin Fry – producer 
 Glenn Gregory – producer 
 Keith Lowndes – producer 
 Danton Supple – recording (1, 3, 7, 11), mixing (1-4, 6, 7, 10, 11)
 Paul Rabiger – recording (2, 4, 5, 6, 8, 9, 10), mixing (5, 8, 9)
 Farrow Design – art direction, design 
 Andy Earl – photography

See also 
 Honeyroot (The ambient music project of Glenn Gregory and Keith Lowndes)

References

External links

1997 albums
ABC (band) albums